Bruntwood is a family-owned property company offering office space, serviced offices, retail space and virtual offices in the north of England and Birmingham in the United Kingdom. They own several high-profile buildings in the Manchester area, as well as in Liverpool, Leeds and Birmingham.

In October 2018, Bruntwood announced a 50:50 partnership with Legal & General Capital focussed on science and technology in regional cities. The new partnership has been named Bruntwood SciTech. Interests include Circle Square and Alderley Park.

Alongside the creation of Bruntwood SciTech, the core work space assets were ring fenced into a business named Bruntwood Works, specialising in different types of workspace products from coworking and serviced offices to traditional leased offices.

Properties
Notable properties in the Bruntwood group include:

Birmingham
Centre City Tower
The McLaren Building

Manchester city centre
111 Piccadilly
Afflecks
Bank Chambers
Manchester One
St. James Buildings

Greater Manchester and Cheshire
Millennium House, Stockport
Abney Hall, Cheadle
Alderley Park

Liverpool
Cotton Exchange
Oriel Chambers
The Plaza

References

Property companies of the United Kingdom
Companies based in Manchester